Closteroviridae is a family of viruses. Plants serve as natural hosts. There are four genera and 59 species in this family, seven of which are unassigned to a genus. Diseases associated with this family include: yellowing and necrosis, particularly affecting the phloem.

Taxonomy

Genome type and transmission vector are two of the most important traits used for classification. Ampeloviruses and Closteroviruses have monopartite genomes and are transmitted by pseudococcid mealybugs (and soft scale insects) and aphids respectively. While  Criniviruses are bipartite and transmitted by whiteflies.

Genera:
 Ampelovirus
 Closterovirus
 Crinivirus
 Velarivirus

Unassigned species:
 Actinidia virus 1
 Alligatorweed stunting virus
 Blueberry virus A
 Megakespama mosaic virus
 Mint vein banding-associated virus
 Olive leaf yellowing-associated virus
 Persimmon virus B

Structure
Viruses in the family Closteroviridae are non-enveloped, with flexuous and filamentous geometries. The diameter is around 10–13 nm, with a length of 950–2200 nm. Genomes are linear and non-segmented, bipartite, around 20kb in length.

Life cycle
Viral replication is cytoplasmic. Entry into the host cell is achieved by penetration into the host cell. Replication follows the positive stranded RNA virus replication model. Positive stranded rna virus transcription is the method of transcription. The virus exits the host cell by tubule-guided viral movement.
Plants serve as the natural host. Transmission routes are mechanical.

References

External links
 ICTV Report: Closteroviridae
 Viralzone: Closteroviridae

 
Virus families
Riboviria